Sahwat al-Khudr (also spelled Sahwat al-Khidr or Sahwet el-Khodar) is a village in southern Syria, administratively part of the al-Suwayda District of the al-Suwayda Governorate, located south of al-Suwayda. In the 2004 census, it had a population of 3,625. The village is named after a Byzantine-era church named dedicated to Saint George (known by local Muslims as "al-Khudr"). It was resettled by Druze in the mid-19th century after a period of abandonment.

History
This village is probably the center of Biblical "Kedar," a regional nation of nomadic shepherd-people who inhabited the general area.  The 19th century German visionary Bl. Anne Catherine Emmerich mentions "Cedar" as also being a city, presumably this city (as verified by her detailed descriptions), to which Jesus visited, so she says, on an historically unrecorded journey.

Sahwat al-Khudr receives its name from an ancient Byzantine church dedicated to Saint George, who is identified with "al-Khudr" by Muslims. An inscription on a monument in the church dates back to 306 CE.

Ottoman era
The population was 142 households and 54 bachelors, all Muslim. They paid a fixed tax-rate of 40 % on agricultural products, including wheat, barley, summer crops, vineyards,  goats and beehives; in addition to occasional revenues and a water mill;  a total of 31,300 akçe. 

In 1838 Eli Smith noted that the place was located  South of Juneineh and that it was in ruins.
Sahwat al-Khudr had been abandoned for a time, but was settled by Druze between 1857 and 1860 at the encouragement of Ismail al-Atrash, a prominent Druze sheikh (chieftain) in the Hauran. In the mid-19th-century, Albert Socin, a European orientalist noted that Sahwat al-Khudr was "a dilapidated town with a castle and a church" surrounded by a forested area. The shrine of al-Khudr in the village was revered by all the religious sects of the vicinity.

Modern era
In the late 1960s, French geographer Robert Boulanger described Sahwat al-Khudr as "a very picturesque place" with an old mosque that was formerly a pagan temple in Antiquity. The mosque's prayer room contained a column with Nabataean inscriptions. The people of the village slaughtered sheep outside of the mosque annually.

Geography
Nearby localities include Salah to the northeast, Miyamas to the north, Hubran to the northwest, Salkhad to the southwest and Orman to the south.

References

Bibliography

External links
 Map of the town, Google Maps

Archaeological sites in as-Suwayda Governorate
19th-century establishments in the Ottoman Empire
Druze communities in Syria
Populated places in as-Suwayda District